Based primarily in Kazan, Tatarstan, Russia, the Kazan State Medical University (KSMU) is a federal university made up of nine faculties.

The university got the license on 6 March 1994 by the State Committee of the Russian Federation of Higher Education. Kazan State Medical University is a multifunctional and multi-levelled state institution of
higher learning in medicine. KSMU functions on the basis of self-governance and belongs to the system of Higher Education and Scientific Research of the Ministry of Health of Russia. On March 6, 1994, the university was issued with a license number 16 G – 235 by the State
Committee of Russian Federation of Higher Education which grants the right to perform
activities in the field of professional education.
Under the auspices of Kazan State Medical University, there is a pharmaceutical and two medical colleges in Kazan, one medical college Mary EI Republic, lycee and biomedical classes on the secondary school basis. According to the results of a rating of medical schools, KSMU takes the 16 place among 86
other universities.
Founded in 1814, KSMU was the second university institution to be founded in Kazan, the third medical university institution in the Russia.

Rankings and reputation
According to the Academic Ranking of World Universities-European Standard ARES-2014, published by European Scientific-Industrial Chamber, KSMU was the third place among the medical universities in Russia. KSMU is ranked 4489 by the Webometrics Ranking of World Universities, and ranked 6381 in the 4icu world university ranking.

Geography and location

Kazan State Medical University (KSMU) is located in the central part of Kazan. The KSMU main campus is on Butlerov Street, although there are also other KSMU buildings throughout Kazan.

Teaching system
The curriculum for general medicine (M.D equivalent to M.B.B.S), dentistry and pharmacy are extensive and updated. Each subject begins with studying of the disease and emphasis is laid on epidemiology, aetiology, pathogenesis, pathological physiology, pathological morphology, clinical picture, methods of laboratory and instrumental examination of a patient, diagnoses, differential diagnoses, complication, prognosis, treatment and prevention. Latin terms are given according to the International Nomenclature of different specialties.
During the period of training students are taught special subjects: in succession they learn theoretical (from 1st to 3rd year) and clinical fundamentals (from 4th to 6th year) and acquire necessary practical skills. Every stage of training builds a foundation to climb up to the next level.

History
In 1804, Emperor Alexander I gave out his royal command to open a university in Kazan. 
In 1814 the faculty of Medicine in Kazan Emperor University is opened
In 1837 Anatomical theater, the unique monument of the Russian classicism of 19th century, is built according to the appearance of Italian Anatomic theaters of Renaissance by M.P.Korinfskiyi with participation of Nikolai Lobachevsky - rector of the Kazan Emperor's University.
In 1840 the university clinic is opened.

In 1930, the Medical Faculty of Kazan State University reorganized into Kazan Medical Institute.

On April 29, 1994, Kazan Medical Institute acquired the status of the Kazan State Medical University.

References

Educational institutions established in 1814
Universities in Kazan
History of Tatarstan
Education in the Soviet Union
Public medical universities
Medical schools in Russia